Billy is the fourth album of noise rock band feedtime, released on March 23, 1996 by Amphetamine Reptile Records. It was the band's first album after they went on hiatus in 1989.

Tom Hazelmyer, founder and owner of Amphetamine Reptile, named Billy one of his favourite releases.

Track listing

Personnel 
Adapted from the Billy liner notes.

feedtime
Rick Johnson – vocals, guitar
Al Larkin – bass guitar
Tom Sturm – drums

Additional musicians and production
David Carter – congas
Peter H. Kemp – photography
Steve Smart – mastering
Dave Trump – engineering, mixing
Greg Wales – engineering, mixing

Release history

References

External links 
 

1996 albums
Amphetamine Reptile Records albums
Feedtime albums